Tolaji Adeyinka Osegie A. Bola (born 4 January 1999) is an English professional footballer who plays as a left back for Bradford City, on loan from Rotherham United.

Club career

Arsenal 
Born in London, Bola began his career at Arsenal, joining at under-9 level. He signed his first professional contract with the club in January 2016.

Bola moved on loan to the League One side Rochdale in October 2020. He made his debut in a 3–0 loss against Hull City on 17 October. He returned to Arsenal in January 2021 after making 11 appearances for the club.

Rotherham United
In August 2021 he signed for Rotherham United. He made his debut for the club in an EFL Trophy game against Doncaster Rovers on 7 September 2021, followed by his league debut against Lincoln City a week later.

In January 2023 he moved on loan to Bradford City.

International career 
Bola is an England youth international, appearing at under-17 and under-18 levels.

Career statistics

References

External links

1999 births
Living people
English footballers
England youth international footballers
Association football defenders
Arsenal F.C. players
Rochdale A.F.C. players
Rotherham United F.C. players
Bradford City A.F.C. players
English Football League players